We Are One: The Obama Inaugural Celebration at the Lincoln Memorial was a public celebration of the then forthcoming inauguration of Barack Obama as the 44th President of the United States at the Lincoln Memorial and the National Mall in Washington, D.C., on January 18, 2009. By some estimates the attendance was over 400,000. The event was musically directed by Rob Mathes of the Kennedy Center Honors.  A backing band used by many of the artists was in the orchestra pit, and featured veteran session drummer Kenny Aronoff.

The concert featured performances by (in alphabetical order) Beyoncé, Mary J. Blige, Jon Bon Jovi, Garth Brooks, Mariah Carey, Sheryl Crow, Renée Fleming, Caleb Green, Josh Groban, Herbie Hancock, Heather Headley, Bettye LaVette, John Legend, John Mellencamp, Jennifer Nettles, Pete Seeger, Shakira, Bruce Springsteen, James Taylor, U2, Usher, will.i.am and Stevie Wonder.  Several of the songs performed had been used by Obama's presidential campaign.

The concert also featured readings of historical passages by Jack Black, Steve Carell, Rosario Dawson, Jamie Foxx, Tom Hanks, Samuel L. Jackson, Ashley Judd, Martin Luther King III, Queen Latifah, Laura Linney, George Lopez, Kal Penn, Marisa Tomei, Denzel Washington, Forest Whitaker and Tiger Woods.

Lineup

Episcopal Bishop of New Hampshire Gene Robinson gave an open prayer to start the celebration.

Broadcast 
Attendance at the concert was free to the public, and HBO also broadcast the concert for free on cable television services on their usually subscription-only network. The concert was broadcast around the world. In Finland it was broadcast live and free to air by YLE TV1. In the Netherlands it was broadcast live and free by Nederland 3. It was broadcast in Portugal by RTP 2 on January 24, 2009. In Sweden it was broadcast by TV8. HBO released the concert as part of a 2 DVD set (including the Inaugural Address and Neighborhood Ball) in April 2010. Also, it was shown for the crowd at Obama's inauguration two days later on megascreens in the hours before the ceremony began.

Reception
The Associated Press called it a "near-flawless production with multiple camera angles and a majestic backdrop in the giant statue of Abraham Lincoln".

References

2009 in American music
2009 in Washington, D.C.
Concerts in the United States
First inauguration of Barack Obama
HBO network specials
Music of Washington, D.C.
National Special Security Events